William Lukens Elkins (May 2, 1832 – November 7, 1903) was an American businessman and art collector. He began his working career as a grocer in Philadelphia and became a business tycoon with financial interests in oil, natural gas and transportation. He was one of the first to convert oil to gasoline and became a major shareholder in Standard Oil. He partnered with Peter Widener to found the Philadelphia Rapid Transit Company and developed streetcar and railway systems throughout several major cities in the United States. He founded the United Gas Improvement Company and was a member of the board of directors of 24 companies.  He was a collector of art and filled his Elkins Estate with over 132 paintings. His estate was valued at $25 million at the time of his death.

Early life
Elkins was born in Wheeling, West Virginia, on May 2, 1832.  He was the seventh child and youngest son to George Elkins and Susanne (née Howell) Elkins. His father was a pioneer in paper manufacturing in the United States. In 1840, his family returned to Philadelphia and William continued his education in the local schools.

Career
He started his business career working as a clerk at a grocery store in Philadelphia. He entered the lumber business but did not have success. In 1852, he entered the produce business in New York and had modest success.  In 1853, he returned to Philadelphia and formed a partnership with Peter Sayboldt to found the produce company Sayboldt & Elkins. By 1860, Elkins bought out his partner and built the produce operation into the largest store of its kind in the United States.

Elkins recognized the potential for the usages of oil being pumped from the oilfields of Northwestern Pennsylvania and became a pioneer in the refining of crude oil. In Philadelphia he founded Monument Oil Works that built a primitive oil refinery which he constantly modernized and expanded into other locations. His company was one of the first to make gasoline and was involved in the production of asphalt. His refining business grew until he was producing 20,000 barrels of gasoline a month. In 1875, Elkins entered into a partnership with Standard Oil. He became a significant shareholder in the company but sold his interests in 1881.

In 1873, William Elkins met Peter Widener and the two became trusted friends. Together they started the Philadelphia Rapid Transit Company, a streetcar and railway business. Elkins and Widener expanded their streetcar enterprise to major cities across the United States including New York, Chicago, Baltimore, St. Louis, Cincinnati and Pittsburgh. Elkins founded the United Gas Improvement Company which implemented gas works in Philadelphia and 60 U.S. cities. He was a member of the board of directors of 24 companies. Elkins held sizeable financial positions in American Tobacco Company and International Mercantile Marine Co.

Elkins was also involved in real estate and partnered with Widener to purchase large tracts of land in North Philadelphia and build several thousand houses for sale.

He served on the Philadelphia City Council for one year in 1876 and served as aide-de-camp with the rank of colonel to Governor John F. Hartranft. He served as commissioner to represent Philadelphia at the International Expositions in Vienna in 1873 and Paris in 1900.

Elkins estate

In 1898, Elkins built a grand 45-room mansion named Elstowe Manor for himself and a mansion named Chelten House for his son on the 42-acre Elkins Estate in Elkins Park, Pennsylvania. Both mansions were designed by Horace Trumbauer.

Elkins was an art collector and instituted a $5,000 prize for "the most meritorious" painting exhibited by an American artist at the Pennsylvania Academy of Fine Arts. In 1900, he published a catalogue of his personal art collections which contained 132 paintings.

Personal life
In 1858, William Elkins married Maria Louise Broomall, with whom he had two daughters and two sons:
 Ida Ameila Elkins (1859–1904), who married Sidney Frederick Tyler (1850–1935), bearing no children. 
 Eleanor Elkins (1861–1937), who married George Dunton Widener, with whom she had three children, and lost her husband and elder son, Harry, in the April 15, 1912 sinking of RMS Titanic.
 George W. Elkins (1858–1919), who married Stella McIntire (1861–1913) and had four children. After her death, he married Allethaire Chase Ludlow (1880–1977).
 William L. Elkins, Jr. (1863–1902), who married Kate Felton, the daughter of Charles N. Felton, United States Congressman and Senator from California.

William Elkins died at his summer home, at age seventy-one on November 7, 1903, in Elkins Park, Pennsylvania.  He was interred at Laurel Hill Cemetery in Philadelphia.  He left behind an estate valued at $25 million. Among his philanthropic gifts, William Elkins left $240,000 to the Masonic Home for Girls in Philadelphia. He bequeathed his art collection to the city to be given following the death of his last heir.

Descendants
Through his son George, he was the grandfather of four grandchildren.  They included Stella Elkins (1884–1963), who married George F. Tyler and founded the Stella Elkins Tyler School of Art. Another granddaughter, Louise Elkins (1890–1977), married Wharton Sinkler.  A grandson, William McIntire Elkins (1882–1947), was a book collector whose collection of early Americana is held at the Free Library of Philadelphia. Through his son William, he was the grandfather of two grandchildren: Felton Broomall Elkins (1889–1944), a playwright and artist, and Marie Louise Broomall Elkins (1892–1961), who married three times and was a Broadway producer.

Citations

Sources
 

1832 births
1903 deaths
19th-century American businesspeople
20th-century American philanthropists
American art collectors
American company founders
American grocers
American businesspeople in the oil industry
American railway entrepreneurs
Burials at Laurel Hill Cemetery (Philadelphia)
Businesspeople in the tobacco industry
Businesspeople from Philadelphia
Businesspeople from Wheeling, West Virginia
Davis and Elkins family
Founders of the petroleum industry
People from Cheltenham, Pennsylvania
Philadelphia City Council members
Standard Oil